Revera (from the word 'reverence') is an intercollegiate sports event conducted by Students Union of Govt Medical College Ernakulam. Games organised in this event are football, cricket, basketball, badminton, volleyball, throwball and table-tennis. First revera was held in April 2018, organised by the 2018 Students' Union, 'SU2k18'.

History 
Revera was started by Students Union 2018 of Govt Medical College Ernakulam. It was organised with a purpose of raising fund for Ashraya – A student Palliative Initiative started in the memory of a medical student. First revera was inaugurated by the veteran volleyball player Tom Joseph on 11 April 2018 at Ernakulam Medical College ground. This volleyball match between Ernakulam Medical College and Sree Narayana Institute of Medical Sciences, was won by the defenders, in their home ground.

Champions

References 

Sports competitions in India